Johnny Russell may refer to:

 Johnny Russell (footballer) (born 1990), Scottish footballer
 Johnny Russell (saxophonist) (1909–1991), American jazz tenor saxophonist
 Johnny Russell (singer) (1940–2001), American country singer
 John R. Countryman (born 1933), American diplomat and former child actor known as Johnny Russell

See also
 John Russell (disambiguation)